Friedrich "Fritz" Fischer (born 22 September 1956) is a former biathlete from Germany. He won a gold medal with Germany in the 4 × 7.5 km relay in the 1992 Winter Olympics. After ending his competitive career Fischer served as a coach for the German biathlon team for many years before retiring in 2014.

Biathlon results
All results are sourced from the International Biathlon Union.

Olympic Games
3 medals (1 gold, 1 silver, 1 bronze)

World Championships
14 medals (9 gold, 4 silver, 1 bronze)

*During Olympic seasons competitions are only held for those events not included in the Olympic program.
**Team was added as an event in 1989.

Individual victories
7 victories (4 In, 3 Sp)

*Results are from UIPMB and IBU races which include the Biathlon World Cup, Biathlon World Championships and the Winter Olympic Games.

References

External links
 

1956 births
Living people
People from Kelheim
Sportspeople from Lower Bavaria
German male biathletes
Biathletes at the 1980 Winter Olympics
Biathletes at the 1984 Winter Olympics
Biathletes at the 1988 Winter Olympics
Biathletes at the 1992 Winter Olympics
Olympic biathletes of West Germany
Olympic biathletes of Germany
Medalists at the 1984 Winter Olympics
Medalists at the 1988 Winter Olympics
Medalists at the 1992 Winter Olympics
Olympic medalists in biathlon
Olympic bronze medalists for West Germany
Olympic silver medalists for West Germany
Olympic gold medalists for Germany
Biathlon World Championships medalists
German cross-country skiing coaches
German sports coaches